Sean Lavan (21 December 1898 – 5 August 1973) was an Irish sprinter. He competed in the 200 metres at the 1924 Summer Olympics and the 1928 Summer Olympics.

References

External links
 

1898 births
1973 deaths
Athletes (track and field) at the 1924 Summer Olympics
Athletes (track and field) at the 1928 Summer Olympics
Irish male sprinters
Olympic athletes of Ireland
Sportspeople from County Mayo